Ian McGregor (born 10 January 1953) was a Scottish footballer who began his career playing for Central League junior teams, including Cumbernauld United, Kilsyth Rangers and Vale of Clyde.  In 1973, he signed 'senior' with Dumbarton, but after being unable to dislodge the No.1 goalkeeper for three seasons he moved to Stenhousemuir.  He was no more successful here and returned to junior football where he played again with Kilsyth Rangers and also with Bonnybridge.

References

1953 births
Scottish footballers
Dumbarton F.C. players
Stenhousemuir F.C. players
Scottish Football League players
Living people
Association football goalkeepers